An auto rickshaw is a motorized version of the pulled rickshaw or cycle rickshaw. Most have three wheels and do not tilt. They are known by many terms in various countries including auto, auto rickshaw, baby taxi, mototaxi, pigeon, jonnybee, bajaj, chand gari, lapa, tuk-tuk, tum-tum, Keke-napep, Maruwa, 3wheel, pragya, bao-bao, easy bike, cng and tukxi.

The auto rickshaw is a common form of transport around the world, both as a vehicle for hire and for private use. They are especially common in countries with tropical or subtropical climates, since they usually are not fully enclosed, and are found in many developing countries because they are relatively inexpensive to own and operate. There are many different auto rickshaw designs. The most common type is characterized by a sheet-metal body or open frame resting on three wheels; a canvas roof with drop-down side curtains; a small cabin at the front for the driver operating handlebar controls; and a cargo, passenger, or dual purpose space at the rear. Another type is a motorcycle that has an expanded sidecar or, less often, is pushing or pulling a passenger compartment.

As of 2019, Bajaj Auto of India is the world's largest auto rickshaw manufacturer, selling 780,000 during the 2019 fiscal year.

Origin

In the 1930s Japan, which was the most industrialized country in Asia at the time, encouraged the development of motorized vehicles including less expensive three-wheeled vehicles based on motorcycles. The Mazda-Go, a 3-wheel open "truck" released in 1931, is often considered the first of what became auto rickshaws. Later that decade the Japanese Ministry of Posts and Telecommunications of Japan distributed about 20,000 used three-wheelers to Southeast Asia as part of efforts to expand its influence in the region. They became popular in some areas, especially Thailand, which developed local manufacturing and design after the Japanese government abolished the three-wheeler license in Japan in 1965.

Production in Southeast Asia started from the knockdown production of the Daihatsu Midget, which was introduced in 1959. An exception is the indigenously modified Philippine tricycle, which originates from the Rikuo Type 97 motorcycle with a sidecar, introduced to the islands in 1941 by the Imperial Japanese Army during World War II.

In Europe, Corradino D'Ascanio, aircraft designer at Piaggio and inventor of the Vespa, came up with the idea of building a light three-wheeled commercial vehicle to power Italy's post-war economic reconstruction. The Piaggio Ape followed suit in 1947.

Regional variations

Africa and the Middle East

Egypt 
Locally named the "tuktuk," the rickshaw is used for transportation in most parts of Egypt. It is generally rare to find in suburban areas and newer parts of cities such as New Cairo and on highways due to police control.

Gaza 
Together with the recent boom of recreational facilities in Gaza for the local residents, donkey carts have all but been displaced by tuk-tuks in 2010. Due to the ban by Egypt and Israel on the import of most motorised vehicles, the tuk-tuks have had to be smuggled in parts through the tunnel network connecting Gaza with Egypt.

Madagascar 
In Madagascar, man-powered rickshaws are a common form of transportation in a number of cities, especially Antsirabe. They are known as "posy" from pousse-pousse, meaning push-push. Cycle rickshaws took off since 2006 in a number of flat cities like Toamasina and replaced the major part of the posy, and are now threatened by the auto rickshaws, introduced in 2009. Provincial capitals like Toamasina, Mahajanga, Toliara, and Antsiranana are taking to them rapidly. They are known as "bajaji" in the north and "tuk-tuk" or "tik-tik" in the east, and are now licensed to operate as taxis. They are not yet allowed an operating licence in the congested, and more polluted national capital, Antananarivo.

Nigeria 

The auto rickshaw is used to provide transportation in cities all over Nigeria. Popularity and use varies across the country however. In Lagos, for example, the "keke" (Yoruba for bicycle) is regulated and transportation around the state's highways is prohibited.

South Africa 

Tuk-tuks, introduced in Durban in the late 1980s enjoyed growing popularity in recent years, particularly in Gauteng.  In Cape Town they are used to deliver groceries and, more recently, transport tourists.

Sudan 
Rickshaws, known as "Raksha" in Sudan, is the most common mean of transportation followed by the bus in the capital Khartoum.

Tanzania 
Locally known as "bajaji", they are a common mode of transportation in Dar es Salaam, and many other cities and villages.

Uganda
A local delivery company called as Sokowatch in 2020 began a pilot project using electric tuk-tuks, to cut pollution.

Zimbabwe 

Hende Moto EV & Taxi company was founded in 2019 by Devine Mafa, an American-Zimbabwean businessman. Hende Moto taxi's were first introduced in Zimbabwe as the first car, manufactured by a Zimbabwean three wheeler manufacturing company Hende Moto Pvt Ltd. Hende Moto Engine in a Safari fiberglass body. The first Hende Moto Taxi was introduced in Kwekwe August 2019, Zimbabwe and thereafter, Victoria Falls City came second and lastly Harare 2019. Hende Moto is also the manufacturer of the first Zimbabwean made electric passenger three wheeled vehicle. It operates on a lithium ion battery that has a range of 70 miles on a 6-hour charge.

South Asia

Afghanistan

Auto rickshaws are very common in the eastern Afghan city of Jalalabad, where they are popularly decorated in art and colors. They are also popular in the northern city of Kunduz.

Bangladesh 

Auto rickshaws (locally called "baby taxis" and more recently "CNGs" due to their fuel source, compressed natural gas) are one of the more popular modes of transport in Bangladesh mainly due to their size and speed. They are best suited to narrow, crowded streets, and are thus the principal means of covering longer distances within urban areas.

Two-stroke engines had been identified as one of the leading sources of air pollution in Dhaka. Thus, since January 2003, traditional auto rickshaws were banned from the capital; only the new natural gas-powered models (CNG) were permitted to operate within the city limits. All CNGs are painted green to signify that the vehicles are eco-friendly and that each one has a meter built-in.

India 

Most cities offer auto rickshaw service, although cycle rickshaws are also common and even hand-pulled rickshaws exist in certain areas such as Kolkata. Many state governments have launched an initiative of women friendly rickshaw service called the Pink Rickshaws driven by women. The drivers are known as the Rickshaw-wallah, auto-wallah or tuktuk-wallah.

Auto rickshaws are used in cities and towns for short distances; they are less suited to long distances because they are slow and the carriages are open to air pollution. Auto rickshaws (often called "autos") provide cheap and efficient transportation. Modern auto rickshaws run on electricity as government pushes for e mobility through its FAME-II scheme, compressed natural gas (CNG) and liquified petroleum gas (LPG) due to government regulations and are environmentally friendly compared to full-sized cars.

To augment speedy movement of traffic, auto rickshaws are not allowed in the southern part of Mumbai.

India is the location of the annual Rickshaw Run.

There are two types of auto rickshaws in India. In older versions the engines were below the driver's seat, while in newer versions engines are in the rear. They normally run on petrol, CNG, or diesel. The seating capacity of a normal rickshaw is four, including the driver's seat. Six-seater rickshaws exist in different parts of the country, but the model was officially banned in the city of Pune on 10 January 2003 by the Regional Transport Authority (RTA).

Apart from this, modern electric auto rickshaws which runs on electric motor have high torque and loading capacity with better speed is also gaining popularity in India. Many auto drivers moved to electric three wheeler as the prices of CNG or Diesel is very high and that type of auto rickshaws are much costlier compared to the electric auto rickshaw. Government is also taking actions to convert current CNG and Diesel rickshaws to Electric Rickshaws.

CNG autos in many cities (e.g. Delhi, Agra) are distinguishable from the earlier petrol-powered autos by a green and yellow livery, as opposed to the earlier black and yellow appearance. In other cities (such as Mumbai) the only distinguishing feature is the 'CNG' print found on the back or side of the auto. Some local governments are considering four-stroke engines instead of two-stroke versions.

Auto rickshaw manufacturers in India include Bajaj Auto, Atul Auto Limited, Oculus Auto, Kerala Automobiles Limited, Force Motors, Mahindra & Mahindra, Piaggio Ape, TVS Motors, Fleek Motors and Khalsa Auto.

In Delhi there also used to be a variant powered by a Harley-Davidson engine called the phat-phati, because of the sound it made. The story goes that shortly after Independence a stock of Harley-Davidson motorbikes were found that had been used by British troops during World War II and left behind in a military storage house in Delhi. Some enterprising drivers purchased these bikes, added on a gear box (probably from a Willys jeep), welded on a passenger compartment that was good for four to six passengers, and put the unconventional vehicles onto the roads. A 1998 ruling of the Supreme Court against the use of polluting vehicles finally signed the death warrant of Delhi's phat-phatis.

 India has about 2.4 million battery-powered, three-wheeled rickshaws on its roads. Some 11,000 new ones hit the streets each month, creating a US$3.1 billion market. Manufacturers include Mahindra & Mahindra Ltd. and Kinetic Engineering. A hindrance to adoption to electric vehicles is the paucity of charging stations; India had only 425 at year-end 2017. By 2022 the number is projected to rise to 2,800.

Generally rickshaw fares are controlled by the government, however auto (and taxi) driver unions frequently go on strike demanding fare hikes. They have also gone on strike multiple times in Delhi to protest against the government and High Court's 2012 order to install GPS systems, and even though GPS installation in public transport was made mandatory in 2015, as of 2017 compliance remains very low.

The 200cc variant of the Bajaj Auto auto rickshaw was used in the 2022 Rickshaw Run to set the record for the world's highest auto rickshaw, over the Umling La Pass, at

Nepal 
Auto rickshaws were a popular mode of transport in Nepal during the 1980s and 1990s, until the government banned the movement of 600 such vehicles in the early 2000s. The earliest auto rickshaws running in Kathmandu were manufactured by Bajaj Auto.

Nepal has been a popular destination for the Rickshaw Run. The 2009 Fall Run took place in Goa, India and ended in Pokhara, Nepal.

Pakistan 
Auto rickshaws are a popular mode of transport in Pakistani towns and are mainly used for travelling short distances within cities. One of the major manufacturers of auto rickshaws is Piaggio. The government is taking measures to convert all gasoline powered auto rickshaws to cleaner CNG rickshaws by 2015 in all the major cities of Pakistan by issuing easy loans through commercial banks. Environment Canada is implementing pilot projects in Lahore, Karachi, and Quetta with engine technology developed in Mississauga, Ontario, Canada that uses CNG instead of gasoline in the two-stroke engines, in an effort to combat environmental pollution and noise levels.

In many cities in Pakistan, there are also motorcycle rickshaws, usually called "chand gari" (moon car) or "chingchi", after the Chinese company Jinan Qingqi Motorcycle Co. Ltd who first introduced these to the market.

There are many rickshaw manufacturers in Pakistan. Lahore is the hub of CNG auto rickshaw manufacturing. Manufacturers include: New Asia automobile Pvt, Ltd; AECO Export Company; STAHLCO Motors; Global Sources; Parhiyar Automobiles; Global Ledsys Technologies; Siwa Industries; Prime Punjab Automobiles; Murshid Farm Industries; Sazgar Automobiles; NTN Enterprises; and Imperial Engineering Company.

Sri Lanka 

Auto rickshaws, commonly known as Three-wheelers, tuk-tuks or trishaws can be found on all roads in Sri Lanka transporting people or freight. Sri Lankan three-wheelers are of the style of the light Phnom Penh-type. Since 2008, the Sri Lankan government has banned the import of all 2-stroke gasoline engines due to environmental concerns. Ones imported to the island now are four-stroke engines. Most three-wheelers are available as hired vehicles, with few being used to haul goods or as private company or advertising vehicles. Bajaj enjoys a virtual monopoly in the island, with its agent being David Pieries Motor Co, Ltd.  A few three-wheelers in Sri Lanka have distance meters. In the capital city it is becoming more and more common. The vast majority of fares are negotiated between the passenger and driver. There are 1.2 million trishaw's in Sri Lanka and most are on financial loans.

In Sri Lanka, tourists are able to drive a tuktuk. Through the Automobile Association of Ceylon, tourists are able to get a temporary Recognition Permit which allows them to drive a three-wheeler legally.

Southeast Asia

Cambodia 

In Cambodia, a passenger-carrying three-wheeled vehicle is known as "lemorque" from the French "remorque." It is a widely used form of transportation in the capital of Phnom Penh and for visitors touring the Angkor temples in Siem Reap. Some have four wheels and is composed of a motorcycle (which leans) and trailer (which does not). Cambodian cities have a much lower volume of automobile traffic than Thai cities, and tuk-tuks are still the most common form of urban transport. There are more than 6,000 tuk-tuks in Phnom Penh, according to the Independent Democracy of Informal Economy Association (IDEA), a union that represents tuk-tuk drivers among other members.

Indonesia 
In Indonesia, auto rickshaws are popular in Jakarta as Bajay, Java, Medan and Gorontalo as Bentor, and some parts of Sulawesi and other places in the country. In Jakarta, the auto rickshaws are called Bajay or Bajaj and they are the same to as the ones in India but are colored blue (for the ones which use Compressed natural gas) and orange (for the ones which use normal gasoline fuel). The blue ones are imported from India with the brand of Bajaj and TVS and the orange ones are the old design from 1977. The orange ones uses two-stroke engines as their prime mover, while the blue ones use four stroke engines.
The orange bajaj has been banned since 2017 due to emission regulations. The Bajaj is one of the most popular modes of transportation in the city. Outside of Jakarta, the bentor-style auto rickshaw is ubiquitous, with the passenger cabin mounted as a sidecar (like in Medan) or in-front (like the ones in some parts of Sulawesi) to a motorcycle.

Philippines 

In the Philippines, a similar mode of public transport is the "tricycle" (Filipino: traysikel; Cebuano: traysikol). Unlike auto rickshaws, however, it has a motorcycle with a sidecar configuration and a different origin. The exact date of its appearance in the Philippines is unknown, but it started appearing after World War 2, roughly at the same time as the appearance of the jeepney. It is most likely derived from the Rikuo Type 97 military motorcycle used by the Imperial Japanese Army in the Philippines starting at 1941. The motorcycle was essentially a licensed copy of a Harley-Davidson with a sidecar. However, there is also another hypothesis which places the origin of the tricycle to the similarly built "trisikad", a human-powered cycle rickshaw built in the same configuration as the tricycle. However, the provenance of the trisikad is also unknown. Prior to the tricycles and trisikad, the most common means of mass public transport in the Philippines is a carriage pulled by horses or carabaos known as the kalesa (calesa or carromata in Philippine Spanish). The pulled rickshaw never gained acceptance in the Philippines. Americans tried to introduce it in the early 20th century, but it was strongly opposed by local Filipinos who viewed it as an undignified mode of transport that turned humans into "beasts".

The design and configuration of tricycles vary widely from place to place, but tends towards rough standardization within each municipality. The usual design is a passenger or cargo sidecar fitted to a motorbike, usually on the right of the motorbike. It is rare to find one with a left sidecar. A larger variant of the tricycle with the motorcycle in the center enclosed by a passenger cab with two side benches is known as a "motorela." It is found in the islands of Mindanao, Camiguin, and Bohol. Another notable variant are the tricycles of the Batanes Islands which have cabs made from wood and roofed with thatched cogon grass. In Pagadian City, tricycles are also uniquely built with the passenger cab slanting upwards, due to the city's streets that run along steep hills.

Tricycles can carry three passengers or more in the sidecar, one or two pillion passengers behind the driver, and even a few on the roof of the sidecar. Tricycles are one of the main contributors to air pollution in the Philippines, which account for 45% of all volatile organic compound emissions since majority of them employ two-stroke engines. However, some local governments are working towards phasing out two-stroke tricycles for ones with cleaner four-stroke engines.

Tuk-Tuks have now been accepted as Three-Wheeled Vehicles by the Land Transportation Office (Philippines) as distinct from tricycles and are now seen in Philippine streets. Electric versions are now seen especially in the city of Manila where they are called e-trikes. Combustion engine tuktuks are locally distributed by TVS Motors and Bajaj Auto through dealerships

Thailand 
The auto rickshaw, called tuk-tuk in Thailand, is a widely used form of urban transport in Bangkok and other Thai cities. The name is onomatopoeic, mimicking the sound of a small (often two-cycle) engine. It is particularly popular where traffic congestion is a major problem, such as in Bangkok and Nakhon Ratchasima. In Bangkok in the 1960s, these were called samlaws.

Bangkok and other cities in Thailand have many tuk-tuks which are a more open variation on the Indian auto rickshaw. About 20,000 tuk-tuks were registered as taxis in Thailand in 2017. Bangkok alone is reported to have 9,000 tuk-tuks.

Tuk-tuk hua kob (ตุ๊ก ๆ หัวกบ; literally: frog-headed tuk tuk) is a unique tuk tuk with a cab looking like a frog's head. Only Phra Nakhon Si Ayutthaya and Trang have vehicles like this.

in 2018, MuvMi, an electric tuk-tuk ride hailing service launched in Bangkok.

East Asia

China 

Various types of auto rickshaw are used around China, where they are called sān lún chē  (三轮车) and sometimes sān bèng zǐ (三蹦子), meaning three wheeler or tricycle.  They may be used to transport cargo or passengers in the more rural areas. However, in many urban areas the auto rickshaws for passengers are often operated illegally as they are considered unsafe and an eyesore. They are permitted in some towns and cities, however.  The Southeast Asian word tuk tuk is transliterated as dū dū chē (嘟嘟车, or beep beep car) in Chinese.

Europe

France 
A number of tuk-tuks (250 in 2013 according to the Paris Prefecture) are used as an alternative tourist transport system in Paris, some of them being pedal-operated with electric motor assist. They are not yet fully licensed to operate and await customers on the streets. Vélotaxis were common during the Occupation years in Paris due to fuel restrictions.

Italy 

Auto rickshaws have been commonly used in Italy since the late 1940s, providing a low-cost means of transportation in the post–World War II years when the country was short of economic resources. The Piaggio Ape (Tukxi), designed by Vespa creator Corradino D'Ascanio and first manufactured in 1948 by the Italian company Piaggio, though primarily designed for carrying freight has also been widely used as an auto rickshaw. It is still extremely popular throughout the country, being particularly useful in the narrow streets found in the center of many little towns in central and southern Italy. Though it no longer has a key role in transportation, Piaggio Ape is still used as a minitaxi in some areas such as the islands of Ischia and Stromboli (on Stromboli no cars are allowed). It has recently been re-launched as a trendy-ecological means of transportation, or, relying on the role the Ape played in the history of Italian design, as a promotional tool.

Portugal
 Tuk Tuks are used in the main touristic cities and regions of the country, specially in Lisbon and the sunny region of Algarve, as a novel form of transport for visitors during the tourist season.

United Kingdom 
In 2006 a British travel writer Antonia Bolingbroke-Kent and her friend Jo Huxster travelled  with an auto rickshaw from Bangkok to Brighton. With this 98 days'
trip they set a Guinness World Record for the longest journey ever with an auto rickshaw. 
In October 2022, Gwent police spent £40,000 on four tuk tuk vehicles in order to help fight crime.

Montenegro 
Tuk Tuk Montenegro has implemented tours with electric Tuk Tuks in Kotor, Montenegro in 2018.

The Americas

El Salvador 
The mototaxi or moto is the El Salvadoran version of the auto rickshaw. These are most commonly made from the front end and engine of a motorcycle attached to a two-wheeled passenger area in back. Commercially produced models, such as the Indian Bajaj brand, are also employed.

Guatemala 
In Guatemala tuk-tuks operate, both as taxis and private vehicles, in Guatemala City, around the island town of Flores, Peten, in the mountain city of Antigua Guatemala, and in many small towns in the mountains. In 2005 the tuk-tuks were prevalent in the Lago de Atitlán towns of Panajachel and Santiago Atitlán. While tuk-tuks continue to serve as a prevalent form of transportation in Antigua Guatemala, their use throughout the country as a whole has declined.

United States 
In the 1950s and 1960s, the United States Post Office (replaced in 1971 by the United States Postal Service) used the WestCoaster Mailster, a close relative of the tuk-tuk. Similar vehicles remain in limited use for parking enforcement, mall security, and other niche applications.
After a short time on the market (Mid-2000s to 2008) in the United States, the vehicles failed to gain popularity in the United States, and as a result, are no longer available. The Manufacturer Bajaj cited the manual transmissions aboard the three-wheelers as the reason for poor sales. As a result of modifications that made the machines EPA and DOT compliant, the vehicles that were sold are still street-legal.

Cuba
In Cuba, the autorickshaws are small and look like a coconut, hence the name Cocotaxi.

Peru 
In Peru, a version of this vehicle is called a motocar or mototaxi.

Fuel efficiency and pollution 
In July 1998, the Supreme Court of India ordered the Government of Delhi to implement CNG or LPG (Autogas) fuel for all autos and for the entire bus fleet in and around the city. Delhi's air quality has improved with the switch to CNG. Initially, auto rickshaw drivers in Delhi had to wait in long queues for CNG refueling, but the situation improved following an increase in the number of CNG stations. Gradually, many state governments passed similar laws, thus shifting to CNG or LPG vehicles in most large cities to improve air quality and reduce pollution. Certain local governments are pushing for four-stroke engines instead of two-stroke ones. Pakistan has passed a similar law prohibiting auto rickshaws in certain areas. CNG auto rickshaws have started to appear in huge numbers in many Pakistani cities.

In January 2007 the Sri Lankan government also banned two-stroke trishaws to reduce air pollution. In the Philippines there are projects to convert carburated two-stroke engines to direct-injected via Envirofit technology. Research has shown LPG or CNG gas direct-injection can be retrofitted to existing engines, in similar fashion to the Envirofit system. In Vigan City majority of tricycles-for-hire as of 2008 are powered by motorcycles with four-stroke engines, as tricycles with two-stroke motorcycles are prevented from receiving operating permits. Direct injection is standard equipment on new machines in India.

In March 2009 an international consortium coordinated by the International Centre for Hydrogen Energy Technologies initiated a two-year public-private partnership of local and international stakeholders aiming at operating a fleet of 15 hydrogen-fueled three-wheeled vehicles in New Delhi's Pragati Maidan complex. As of January 2011, the project was nearing completion.

Hydrogen internal combustion (HICV) use in three-wheelers has only recently being started to be looked into, mainly by developing countries, to decrease local pollution at an affordable cost. At some point, Bajaj Auto made a HICV auto rickshaw together with the company "Energy Conversion Devices". They made a report on it called "Clean Hydrogen Technology for 3-Wheel Transportation in India" and it stated that the performance was comparable with CNG autos. In 2012, Mahindra & Mahindra showcased their first HICV auto rickshaw, called the Mahindra HyAlfa. The development of the hydrogen-powered rickshaw happened with support from the International Centre for Hydrogen Energy Technologies.

World records 

On September 16, 2022, at 11:04 a.m. (Indian Standard Time), a Canadian team (Greg Harris and Priya Singh) and a Swiss team (Michele Daryanani & Nevena Lazarevic) set the world record for the highest altitude at which an auto rickshaw has ever been driven.

The two teams were participating in the Rickshaw Run (Himalayan Edition), an event promoted by The Adventurists, where teams drive auto rickshaws from the Thar desert town of Jaisalmer in Rajasthan the Himalayan town of Leh in Ladakh. Rickshaw Run teams are given the start and finish lines, but are otherwise unsupported and left to their own navigational choices in completing the approximately 2,300 km journey.

The road at Umling La Pass was constructed by India's Border Roads Organization and completed in 2017. Guinness World Records certified the road as the highest motorable road in the world.

See also 
 Fuel gas-powered scooter
 Formic acid vehicle: a type of hydrogen-based vehicle
 Jeepney
 Rickshaw (disambiguation)

Explanatory notes

References

External links 

 The India 1000 an article in Wired about auto rickshaw racing

Rickshaws
.
Vehicles for hire
Public transport in India
Public transport in Thailand
Road transport in Egypt
Road transport in Pakistan
Public transportation in the Philippines
Public transport in Nigeria